Soroca is a city and municipality in Moldova, situated on the Dniester River about  north of Chișinău. It is the administrative center of the Soroca District.

History

The city has its origin in the medieval Genoese trade post of Olchionia, or Alchona. It is known for its well-preserved stronghold, established by the Moldavian prince Stephen the Great (Ștefan cel Mare in Romanian) in 1499. The origins of the name Soroca are not fully known. Soroca (Russian: сорока) means Magpie in Russian. Its location is only a few kilometers from the Moldova–Ukrainian border.

The original wooden fort, which defended a ford over the Dniester, was an important link in the chain of fortifications which comprised four forts (e.g., Bilhorod-Dnistrovskyi, then known as Akkerman, and Khotyn) on the Dniester, two forts on the Danube, and three forts on the north border of medieval Moldavia. Between 1543 and 1546, under the rule of Peter IV Rareș, the fort was rebuilt in stone as a perfect circle with five bastions situated at equal distances.

During the Great Turkish War, John III Sobieski's forces successfully defended the fort against the Ottomans. It was of vital military importance during the Pruth River Campaign of Peter the Great in 1711. The stronghold was sacked by the Russians in the Austro-Russian–Turkish War (1735–39). The Soroca Fort is an important attraction in Soroca, having preserved cultures and kept the old Soroca to the present day.

The locality was greatly extended in the 19th century, during a period of relative prosperity. Soroca became a regional center featuring large squares, modernized streets, hospitals, grammar schools and conventionalized churches. During the Soviet period, the city became an important industrial center for northern Moldova.

Soroca was known for producing grapes, wheat, maize, and tobacco in 1919.

Climate
The climate in Soroca is a warm-summer subtype (Köppen: Dfb) of the humid continental climate.

Demographics
The population was estimated at 35,000 in 1919. It consisted mainly of Jews. Romanians, Germans, and Russians also lived in the city. The city once had a Jewish population of around 18,000, but there are only 100 today and 20 of them are considered Jewish according to the halakha.

In 2012, Soroca had an estimated 37,500 inhabitants.

The city has a sizable Romani minority and is popularly known as the "Romani capital of Moldova."

Mayor
The Mayor of Soroca is head of the executive branch of Soroca City Council.

Natives 

 
 Samuel Bronfman (1889–1971), a Canadian entrepreneur, former owner of Seagram
 Alexandru Cimbriciuc
 Arkady Gendler - Yiddish Singer
 Sofia Imber, a Venezuelan journalist, founder of the Contemporary Art Museum of Caracas
 Isaac Kitrosser, French photojournalist
 Anna Mincovschi, mother of Robert Hossein
 Kira Muratova, a Soviet and Ukrainian film director, screenwriter and actress
 David Seltzer (1904–1994), New York Yiddish language writer, journalist and poet
 Marina Shafir, a Moldovan mixed martial arts and professional wrestler currently works for All Elite Wrestling.
 Nicolae Șoltuz, a member of Sfatul Țării
 Robert Steinberg, a Canadian mathematician
 Leonte Tismăneanu, a Romanian communist activist
 Eugen Ţapu (1983–2009), a protester in the post-election riots in Chișinău who died while in police custody
 Gheorghe Ursu (1926–1985), a Romanian construction engineer and dissident
 Mark Tkaciuk, historian, politician

Media
 Observatorul de Nord, a newspaper from Soroca, founded in 1998
 Vocea Basarabiei, 67,69 and 103.1

Gallery

International relations

Twin towns – Sister cities
Soroca is twinned with:
  Bryansk, Russia
  Flămânzi, Romania
  Suceava, Romania

See also
 History of the Jews in Bessarabia
 Romani people in Romania
 Armenians in Moldova

References

Further reading 
  Soroki/Soroca (pp. 376–380) at Miriam Weiner's Routes to Roots Foundation

External links 

 

 
Cities and towns in Moldova
Municipalities of Moldova
Populated places on the Dniester
Capitals of the counties of Bessarabia
Soroksky Uyezd
Soroca County (Romania)
Shtetls
Romani communities in Moldova
Soroca District